As the Roots Undo is the debut studio album by screamo band Circle Takes the Square in 2004. It was released on CD and vinyl by the Robotic Empire and HyperRealist labels respectively. The album would later see a repress on the LP format in 2014 through GatePost Recordings

The album is a contender for the most celebrated screamo record. Noisey called it "one of the most critically acclaimed cult classics in modern hardcore" which has "long garnered praise from both the press and fans alike for its forward-thinking blend of 90s screamo, fractured grindcore, and experimental post-rock." On June 11, 2010, Sputnikmusic placed it at number 3 on its list of the 100 best album of the decade.

Content and Packaging
The CD is packaged in a four-fold flap with artwork along each side; the artwork was done by band member Drew Speziale.

When asked about his influences at the time of writing As the Roots Undo, Drew Speziale referred to bands that were innovating punk and hardcore through incorporating a lot of melody, including their tour-mates Majority Rule, Pg. 99 and City of Caterpillar and bands who had "really dark melodies going on underneath [an] overtly pretty brutal sound" such as Orchid and His Hero Is Gone, besides less intense artists such as Godspeed You! Black Emperor, Modest Mouse and Built to Spill.

Track listing

Personnel
Circle Takes the Square
Drew Speziale - guitar, vocals, artwork
Jay Wynne - drums, sampler, vocals
Kathy Coppola - bass, vocals

Production and Artwork
Collin Kelly - layout
Matt Gauck - layout
Sam Maynard - layout
Anthony Stubelek - recording

References

External links
[ All Music page] — As the Roots Undo on Allmusic

2004 albums
Circle Takes the Square albums
Robotic Empire albums
Concept albums